The Commonwealth Weightlifting Championships are an international weightlifting competition, open to countries of the Commonwealth of Nations. They are usually held every non-Commonwealth Games year under the auspices of the Commonwealth Weightlifting Federation (often combined with associated continental championships) and serve as a qualifying tournament for the Games themselves.

Editions
The championships have been staged as follows:

References

External links
Official website

Weightlifting competitions
Weightlifting